The 1974–75 Utah Stars season was the fifth season of the franchise in Utah (and 8th overall) in the American Basketball Association (ABA). Despite declining from the previous season for the 3rd straight year, the Stars went into the playoffs once again, finishing seven games over San Diego for 4th place. In the Semifinals, they lost to the Denver Nuggets in 6 games. As it turned out, this was their final playoff appearance, as the team folded midway through the next season. 

Before the season, the Stars signed a 19-year old Moses Malone straight out of Petersburg High School in Petersburg, Virginia to a five-year contract.

Roster  
 24 Ron Boone - Shooting guard 
 35 Roger Brown - Small forward 
 32 Randy Denton - Center
 34 Clyde Dickey - Shooting guard 
 33 Jim Eakins - Power forward 
 25 Gerald Govan - Power forward 
 11Wali Jones - Shooting guard 
 22 Moses Malone - Center
 30 Roy McPipe - Shooting guard 
 44 Larry Miller - Shooting guard 
 15 John Roche - Point guard 
 10 Bruce Seals - Small forward 
 20 Al Smith - Point guard 
 44 Hank Williams - Small forward

Final standings

Western Division

Asterisk denotes playoff berth

Playoffs 
Western Division Semifinals

References

External links
 RememberTheABA.com 1974–75 regular season and playoff results
 Utah Stars page

Utah Stars
Utah Stars seasons
Utah Stars, 1974–75
Utah Stars, 1974–75